The Lucasian Chair of Mathematics is a mathematics professorship in the University of Cambridge, England; its holder is known as the Lucasian Professor. The post was founded in 1663 by Henry Lucas, who was Cambridge University's Member of Parliament in 1639–1640, and it was officially established by King Charles II on 18 January 1664. It was described by The Daily Telegraph as one of the most prestigious academic posts in the world. Since its establishment, the professorship has been held by, among others,  Isaac Newton, Charles Babbage, George Stokes, Joseph Larmor, Paul Dirac, and Stephen Hawking.

History
Henry Lucas, in his will, bequeathed his library of 4,000 volumes to the university and left instructions for the purchase of land whose yielding should provide £100 a year for the founding of a professorship.

Babbage applied for the vacancy in 1826, after Turton, but Airy was appointed.  William Whewell (who considered applying, but preferred both Herschel and Babbage to himself) remarked that he would be the best professor, but that the heads of the colleges would not see that.  Nonetheless, Babbage was appointed when the chair became free again two years later.

The current and 19th Lucasian Professor is Michael Cates, starting from 1 July 2015.
The previous holder of the post was theoretical physicist Michael Green who was a fellow in Clare Hall. He was appointed in October 2009, succeeding Stephen Hawking, who himself retired in September 2009, in the year of his 67th birthday, as required by the university. Green holds the position of Emeritus Lucasian Professor of Mathematics.

List of Lucasian professors

Cultural references
In the final episode of the science-fiction television series Star Trek: The Next Generation, one of the main characters, the android Data, holds the Lucasian Chair in the late 24th century, albeit in an alternate reality.

References

Further reading
Kevin Knox and Richard Noakes, From Newton to Hawking: A History of Cambridge University's Lucasian Professors of Mathematics 

1663 establishments in England
 
Professorships at the University of Cambridge
Faculty of Mathematics, University of Cambridge
Professorships in mathematics
Mathematics education in the United Kingdom